Tálknafjarðarhreppur is a municipality in Iceland. Its only settlement is Tálknafjörður. On the land side the municipality is surrounded by the municipality of Vesturbyggð. There is considerable cooperation between the two municipalities but unification was voted down in the latest election.

References 

Municipalities of Iceland
Westfjords